The End of the Matter (1977) is a science fiction novel  by American writer Alan Dean Foster. The book is fourth chronologically in the Pip and Flinx series.

Plot summary
The novel takes place immediately after Orphan Star with Flinx taking his new space ship, the Teacher, built by the Ulru-Ujurrians, to Alaspin, the home planet of his minidrag Pip, in search of the man who bid on him when Flinx was a child in a slave auction.

He not only finds this man, Skua September, but also acquires a strange new alien pet, Abalamahalamatandra (Ab for short), and is pursued by an assassin squad called the Qwarm. Flinx's friends Bran Tse-Mallory and Truzenzuzex show up looking for Ab in the hope of finding an ancient weapon, thought to possibly be capable of stopping a rogue black hole, before the three inhabited planets on the black hole's course are sucked in.

References

External links

Alan Dean Foster homepage

1977 American novels
Humanx Commonwealth
Novels by Alan Dean Foster
1977 science fiction novels
Sequel novels
American science fiction novels